The local assembly of bishops is the Episcopal Conference of Malawi (Episcopal Conference of Malawi, ECM), established in 1961. Constituent bodies of the ECM are: the plenary assembly of bishops, the Catholic Secretariat and six committees (Catholic development, justice and peace, education, health, pastoral care and communications).
The ECM is a member of the Association of Member Episcopal Conferences in Eastern Africa (AMECEA) and Symposium of Episcopal Conferences of Africa and Madagascar (SECAM).

List of presidents of the Bishops' Conference:

1966–1967: John Baptist Hubert Theunissen, Archbishop of Blantyre

1969–1980: James Chiona, Archbishop of Blantyre

1980–1984: Felix Eugenio Mkhori, Bishop of Chikwawa

1984–1994: James Chiona, Archbishop of Blantyre

1994–2000: Felix Eugenio Mkhori, Bishop of Chikwawa

2000–2012: Tarcisius Gervazio Ziyaye, Bishop of Lilongwe and Archbishop of Blantyre

2012–2015: Joseph Mukasa Zuza, Bishop of Mzuzu

2015–2022: Thomas Luke Msusa, Archbishop of Blantyre

2022–present: George Desmond Tambala, Archbishop of Lilongwe

See also
Catholic Church in Malawi

References

External links
 https://www.ecmmw.org
 http://episcopalconferencemalawi.wordpress.com/
 http://www.gcatholic.org/dioceses/country/MW.htm
 http://www.catholic-hierarchy.org/country/mw.html 

Malawi
Catholic Church in Malawi

it:Chiesa_cattolica_in_Malawi#Conferenza_episcopale